The Tiger of Yautepec (Spanish:El tigre de Yautepec) is a 1933 Mexican film. It was directed by 
Fernando de Fuentes.

The plot of the film is about a good man and his son who are kidnapped by a bunch of bandits called 'Los Chacales'. Twenty years after, another band of 'banditos' (Los Plateados) terrorizes the region. The leader of 'Los Plateados', El Tigre (Ortiz), is the boy kidnapped 20 years before. El Tigre knows beautiful Dolores (Gallardo) and decides to conquer her... without knowing she's his long-lost sister.

External links
 

1933 films
1930s Spanish-language films
Films directed by Fernando de Fuentes
Mexican black-and-white films
1930s adventure drama films
Mexican adventure drama films
1933 drama films
1930s Mexican films